Mark Alan Royals (born June 22, 1965) is a former American football punter in the National Football League. He attended Mathews High School. He was the last player from the St. Louis Cardinals to retire from the NFL. He was a color commentator for coverage of the Arena Football League's Tampa Bay Storm on the regional sports television network Spectrum Sports Florida. He has also co-hosted various sports radio shows since retiring.

Career

1994 AFC Wildcard Game 
Royals may be best known for a bad punt he kicked in the 1993 AFC wildcard game between the Pittsburgh Steelers and the Kansas City Chiefs on January 8, 1994. Near the end of the fourth quarter with Pittsburgh leading Kansas City by seven points, Royals failed to direct a punt towards a sideline, and instead, punted the ball forward directly towards the line of scrimmage. The punt was blocked and recovered by Kansas City. With 1:43 remaining in the fourth quarter and on 4th down, Kansas City quarterback Joe Montana threw a touchdown pass to receiver Tim Barnett. The ensuing PAT tied the game which then went into sudden death overtime. Kansas City kicker Nick Lowery eventually kicked the game winning field goal for the Chiefs eliminating the Steelers from the playoffs.

References 

1965 births
Living people
American football punters
Chowan Hawks football players
Appalachian State Mountaineers football players
Dallas Cowboys players
Philadelphia Eagles players
St. Louis Cardinals (football) players
Tampa Bay Buccaneers players
Pittsburgh Steelers players
Detroit Lions players
New Orleans Saints players
Miami Dolphins players
Jacksonville Jaguars players
American color commentators
Sportspeople from Hampton, Virginia
Players of American football from Virginia
People from Mathews, Virginia
National Football League replacement players